Dinghy sailing is the activity of sailing small boats by using five essential controls:
 the sails
 the foils (i.e. the daggerboard or centreboard and rudder and sometimes lifting foils as found on the Moth)
 the trim (forward/rear angle of the boat in the water)
 side-to-side balance of the dinghy by hiking or movement of the crew, particularly in windy weather ("move fast or swim")
 the choice of route (in terms of existing and anticipated wind shifts, possible obstacles, other water traffic, currents, tides etc.)
When racing, the above skills need to be refined and additional skills and techniques learned, such as the application of the "racing rules of sailing", boat handling skills when starting and when rounding marks, and knowledge of tactics and strategy. Racing tactics include positioning the boat at different angles. To improve speed when racing, sailors should position themselves at the windward direction (closest to the direction of the wind) in order to get "clean air".

The RYA, the regulating authority for sail training in the UK, states that, "With a reliance on nature and the elements, sailing ... is about adventure, exploration, teamwork and fun."

Development of the dinghy

Early beginnings 
There has always been a need for small tender boats for transporting goods and personnel to and from anchored sailing ships. Together with other smaller work craft such as fishing and light cargo, small inshore craft have always been in evidence. Charles II of England had a private sailing boat presented to him when he returned from exile to England in the 17th century, and he sailed for recreation and competition.

In 1887 Thomas Middleton, a Dublin solicitor, considered that yacht racing was becoming an excessively expensive activity, with boats becoming eclipsed by better designs each year. He proposed the 'One Model' principle. He wanted yacht racing to be an exercise of skill with all boats being built to the same design. He assembled a group of potential owners who agreed to call the boat 'The Water Wag'. The Water Wag Club still prospers in Dún Laoghaire harbour, with racing each Wednesday evening during the Summer season.

Towards the end of the 19th century people began to use these small boats for sport and recreational sailing, utilising the opportunities for leisure afforded by the Industrial Revolution. Larger privately used sailing boats had developed separately, and have resulted in the yachts of today. There has been some crossover, in that the sloop sail plan was adopted as standard and most convenient by early dinghy designers.

Planing and trapezing

The development of the sailing dinghy was helped in the early 20th century by Uffa Fox (1898–1972), an English boat designer and sailing enthusiast. He developed and contributed to many dinghy classes that are still with us nearly a century later: the Albacore, International 14, National 12, Jet 14, Firefly and Flying Fifteen.  The Scorpion was designed in 1959 by Taprell Dorling.

He also introduced the major advance of hull shapes that can plane, and which can therefore reach beyond the usual speed limits for small sailing boats. In effect, a boat which is planing is skimming along the surface, with the bow of the boat not in the water. This results in less friction because of reduced waterline length, reduced displacement (the amount of water needing to be pushed aside by the boat), and reduced 'wetted area'. The driving force provided by the sails has to overcome less resistance, and therefore speed increases dramatically.

In 1928 Uffa Fox introduced planing to the English dinghy racing world in his International 14 boat, the Avenger. He gained 52 first places, two second places and three third places out of 57 race starts that year. Note: Graham Anderson in his 1999 book Fast Light Boats, a Century of Kiwi Innovation argues that planing centreboard sailing boats were introduced into New Zealand in the early 20th century – well before Uffa Fox popularised the concept.

Another advance in dinghy sailing was introduced in the 1930s, when the technique of trapezing was introduced. This involves using the crew to provide more leverage (than possible by hiking out) to keep the sails vertical and the boat balanced; doing this can prevent the boat from capsizing, by hanging outside the boat on a harness and rope attached to the 'hounds' or upper mast. As a result, the boat is easier to keep upright, and the sails can deliver maximum power most of the time. While trapezing can be helpful and increase speed, it can also be very dangerous if the crew is not wearing a quick-release harness or is inexperienced. The quick-release harness allows the crew to unstrap themselves quickly so as to not get forced under the boat if it were to capsize.

Trapezing during a race first appeared in 1934, on the Amazon A Class Rater.

Uffa Fox started building 14s in 1923, and was designing them by 1925. He was to transform the class with the introduction of his first planing hull design, Avenger, in 1927. The construction and finish of his 14s was considered by many to be the ultimate in quality and craftsmanship, and Thunder and Lightning built in 1938 was no exception.

The hull was built of two thin veneers; diagonal internally and fore and aft externally, and stiffened by tiny rock elm frames, all fastened with thousands of copper nails. His aim was to achieve as light a construction as possible using the materials of the day – there was no carbon fibre or Kevlar then.

Within a week of being launched, Thunder & Lightning won one of yachting's premier racing trophies, the Prince of Wales Cup, held that year at Falmouth. It was during this series that the boat's owners, Peter Scott (son of the famous  Scott of the Antarctic), and John Winter, used a device now commonly known as the trapeze. At that time it was known as King George's Jubilee Truss. The device was immediately banned by the Yacht Racing Committee on the grounds that it was unsporting and gave an unfair advantage to its users. Thunder & Lightning is now in the National Maritime Museum Cornwall

The innovative technique was immediately banned, and received little development until it was reintroduced on the Osprey and Fiveohfive Class (505) in 1954 by John Westell and the Flying Dutchman class in the early 1960s.

Post WWII developments
During the Second World War plywood had become a major building material for aircraft. After the war, plywood was adapted for building sailing dinghies. Two primary methods of construction were adopted: stitch and glue and timber-framed construction. Jack Holt designed many dinghies to be built by home handymen using these construction techniques. The Mirror Dinghy was predominantly built using stitch and glue, while the Enterprise and  Heron is an example of a boat built using plywood on a timber frame.

Modern developments

At the beginning of the 21st century, dinghy sailing is still a rapidly developing sport. It is losing its image of being expensive, time-consuming, and exclusive. This is because of the earlier work of pioneers such as Uffa Fox, and through the use of modern designs and techniques such as lighter hull materials (e.g., fibreglass and foam sandwich hull construction, which eliminate time-consuming maintenance and constant care that wooden hulls required, although they are rare and only a few people make them some still sail with wooden boats), more responsive sail materials and design, easily transportable boats (many car-toppable), and simpler rigs such as gennakers instead of more complex spinnakers. These advances are more economical in time and money, and have greatly extended the appeal of dinghy sailing.

In Britain, the RYA regulates racing and provides modular and accredited training courses for leisure and competitive sailing. A basic sailing course can be completed in several days. Similar organisations exist worldwide to administer and promote both leisure and competitive sailing.

Types of dinghies

Some dinghies come into more than one category,  either because boundaries overlap or because different categories are measuring different things;  e.g. both "one design" boats and boats of much freer design can be found in each of the main categories below.

Dinghy designs are often referred to as "classes"; these classes are usually categorised as one design, open, or restricted. A more formal term for open is "Development Class". One design dinghies are supposed to be identical, though in reality this is not always the case. Only the most restrictive one design classes will restrict individual fittings. Then there becomes a sliding scale of allowable modification or design differences; restricted classes would typically allow the movement of fittings or even parts of the boat around, but are unlikely to allow major changes to hull shape or sails. Truly open development classes are also almost unknown, the famous line about the 18 ft skiff "the boat shall be 18ft long and the race starts at 2 o'clock" is a myth but open classes will usually allow pretty radical changes within usually some kind of box rule which specifies depth, length, width of hull height of mast and sometimes a minimum weight and sail area.

Classes which are not development classes are usually referred to as "One design". The idea is that One Designs provide a fair and level playing field for even competition, whereas Development Classes drive boat speed and technology forwards.   The first one design was the Water Wag designed by Thomas Middleton, which first sailed in Dublin Bay in 1887. The class is still sailed today, well over a hundred years later. The first International one-design class was the B.R.A. 12 foot dinghy which was designed by George Cockshott in 1914 for West Kirby marine lake. This design expanded to Holland, Netherlands, Germany, France, Ireland etc. and further afield.

All of the following classes can be used for recreational as well as racing purposes. Some function better for recreation use because they require less maintenance and can be left on a mooring, while other (usually racing) boats can't be left on mooring because they will capsize, which can cause certain parts like the mast and hull to be damaged.

Sailing skiffs are the fastest and arguably most difficult type of dinghy to sail. A skiff has a flat narrow hull with a disproportionately large sailplan, usually consisting of an asymmetric spinnaker, blade jib and fully battened main. Sailors manage the rig with the use of racks (wings) and trapeze.  Examples are the 49er, an Olympic boat, 18 Footers (see below) and the advanced International 14.

High-performance dinghies are fast and powerful dinghies designed for racing around an Olympic triangle (Olympic Racing Course). Examples of such dinghies are the International Flying Dutchman, the International 505, the Jet 14, the Fireball, the Osprey, the Thistle, the 14 ft John Spencer Javelin and the International 470. They can all plane easily, even upwind and they use trapeze and a symmetric spinnaker. Not all are two handed boats: the International Contender and the RS600 are high performance single handed boats equipped with a trapeze, but not a spinnaker, and demonstrate a comparable performance. Skiffs are usually classed as High performance dinghies.

Racing dinghies are designed for racing,  but not all have necessarily the same calibre of performance as the above.  However, in many cases they can still offer equally close competition,  at the very highest standards,  which for many racing helmsmen and crews is the most important consideration.  They cover a wide range, and many are descended from Uffa Fox's seminal International 14. People often "travel" with their dinghies to international races in famous sailing spots such as Lake Garda in Italy.  The Snipe International Class still stands as one of the strongest classes, after reaching the status of world's largest fleet of dinghies in July 1936.  Other examples include the GP14, Enterprise, Scorpion, Solo, Graduate, Firefly, Lark.  A specialized subgroup is the Scow, which typically uses two bilgeboards instead of a centerboard, and may have two rudders. Many racing dinghies require two or more people to sail the boat, the skipper is in charge or steering and the main sail depending on the boat, and the crew is in charge of the jib, the spinnaker,(which can only be flown while going downwind) and keeping the boat level

Cruising dinghies are designed for leisure and family sailing and are usually more stable than high-performance dinghies. This is provided by a 'chined' (less rounded) hull, greater displacement, and proportionally smaller sail area. Some are specifically designed for longer passage-making,  and/or for camping aboard.  Examples of these include the Wayfarer, arguably the GP14, the Tideway, the Laser Stratos, the Drascombe series of dinghies, the CL 16 and the Laser 16, the Roamer Cruising Dinghy, designed by Eric Coleman an early member of the Dinghy Cruising Association, plus many designs of Iain Oughtred, John Welsford and François Vivier. Sailing these boats can still give much excitement.

Cruiser-racer dinghies successfully combine elements of both the immediately previous two groups,  offering good racing performance and also being very viable cruising boats.   Arguably the only two world-class cruiser-racer dinghies,  in terms of both the extensive availability of top class racing and their suitability for serious cruising,  are the Wayfarer and the GP14;  of these the Wayfarer has the edge for cruising,  once on the water,  in part because she is the larger boat,  while the GP14 has the edge for racing.  However the Mirror and her larger sisters,  and the Heron,  can also be regarded as coming into this category.

Classic dinghies are typically used as yacht tenders or shore boats, and emphasize beauty and versatility over sailing performance. Although some are still made entirely from wood, the majority of the most popular classic sailing dinghies combine a fiberglass hull with enough finely finished teak or mahogany to represent the "best of two worlds" approach. The fiberglass hull makes the boat maintenance easier and some think they are sturdier and will not corrode like wood.  Examples of classic sailing dinghies are Minto, Mirror Dinghy, Fatty Knees, Trinka, Bauer, Whitehall, and Gig Harbor.

Safety dinghies were designed to be used as yacht tenders with the added function of proactive self-rescue boat that can be sailed to safety. These boats are also used as recreational sailboats. Some of them can be fitted out with exposure canopies, sea anchors, and other survival gear. Examples of safety dinghies are the Portland Pudgy dinghy and the Clam dinghy.

Multihulls are fast twin or three hulled boats that fall under the definition of dinghy. Unlike dinghies, multihulls have high aspect ratio rigs with fully battened mainsails and sometimes, a rotating mast. This allows the rig to be highly aerodynamic and the reduced drag from the thin hulls, gives a multihull its great speed advantage over traditional monohulls. Dinghy-sized multihulls are sometimes referred to as "Beach Catamarans or Beach Trimarans".

The International 14 remains a popular racing class, having acquired racks (for trapezing crews) and a gennaker since its original design. The Laser Standard, Laser Radial and Laser 4.7 are the variants of the Laser dinghy, a single-hander whose combination of simplicity, portability and performance has done much to advance dinghy racing and training.  More modern dinghies like the Phil Morrison designed RS200, RS400, RS800 and RS Vareo Dinghies, the Musto Skiff, Splash and RS600  have also increased dinghy sailing participation around the UK. Two popular dinghies used in high school and college racing are the 420 and Flying Junior.

Sports boats: These classes are larger off-shore racing dinghies which shade off into classes of yachts with fixed keels. Usually they have several crew members as well as the helm. Melges 24 and Laser SB3 are current examples of this type.

Development classes: Most dinghy classes have a fairly fixed layout of sails and hull design, and changes are very infrequent. However, some classes can compete and sail with less rigid definitions and measurements. This encourages experiment which often leads to innovation in techniques and construction. Examples are the International 14, National 12, the 18ft Skiff, the Puddle Duck Racer and the Moth. The International Moth is worth noting because of its use of lifting foils on the rudder and daggerboard.

Learning to sail

Many people learn to sail at accredited sailing schools, or through their local sailing club. Many books and training DVDs are also available, allowing the novice sailor to reinforce the learning in their own time.
Boats that many children learn to sail in are the Optimist, Topper,the Laser Funboat and Laser Picos, and the Portland Pudgy. The Optimist is primarily used in supervised racing situations because it is easily capsized and very difficult to right from the water. In the US, the Portland Pudgy safety dinghy has become a popular beginners' sailing dinghy for non-racing, recreational use because it is unsinkable and very stable.

It is easier for children to learn on small boats and work their way up to larger boats as they grow. Children learn better in a protected harbor or cove because there is less wind than the wide open ocean. The Wayfarer was the standard teaching boats for adult schemes; however, many centres have moved onto more modern 'Centre-Main' boats such as the Laser Stratos and Topaz Omega. In Australia the main boats children learn in are Sabot (dinghy), Manly Junior, Heron, Topaz Dinghy, Flying Eleven, Optimist with the O'pen BIC becoming more popular. Adults often learn in Spirals or Sabres or by crewing in NS14s or Tasars. 
In the UK, the Royal Yachting Association is the governing body of all dinghy sailing qualifications, offering Youth Stage 1 through 4 certificates, and Adult Level 1 through 3 certificates. More and more boat hire companies ask to see certificates before they will allow you to hire out a boat. In Australia Yachting Australia fulfils a similar role. On yachts in Australia a Competent Crew course is usually the first formal learn to sail course.

Dinghy racing

Racing is one of the most popular forms of dinghy sailing, and it contributes to the development of sailing skills as well as to improvements in dinghy and sail construction and design. Sometimes the Olympic triangle is used as a course for dinghy races where space permits, particularly for events where there ought to be little local advantage such as State and National titles and for classes which are mainly displacement sailing such as the Heron (dinghy). The olympic triangle is the most popular choice for dinghy racing, but a windward leeward course is another popular option.

See also

Dinghy
 Dinghy racing

References

Bibliography 
Bob Bond  "The Handbook of Sailing" DK & Pelham Books revised 1996

Further reading
 

 Sailing
Sailing (sport)